Legislative elections were held in France on 17 June 1951 to elect the second National Assembly of the Fourth Republic.

After the Second World War, the three parties which took a major part in the French Resistance to the German occupation dominated the political scene and government: the French Communist Party (PCF), the French Section of the Workers' International (SFIO, socialist party) and the Christian democratic Popular Republican Movement (MRP). The forces associated with the Third Republic and the 1940 disaster (the Radical Party and the classical Right) were considered as archaic and were the losers of the post-war elections.

Nevertheless, after the proclamation of the Fourth Republic, the 1947 strikes and the beginning of the Cold War, the Three-parties alliance split. In spring 1947, the Communist ministers were dismissed. At the same time, Charles de Gaulle, symbol of the Resistance, founded his Rally of the French People (RPF) which campaigned for constitutional reform and criticized the "parties' regime" as a rebirth of the defunct Third Republic.

The Socialists and the Christian-Democrats allied with the Rally of the Republican Lefts (composed of the Radicals and the Democratic and Socialist Union of the Resistance, UDSR) and right-wing groupings to form the Third Force. This coalition defended the regime against the opposition of the Communists on the one hand, and the Gaullists on the other. But this diverse alliance did not lead to a stable executive power. Indeed, its components advocated opposing policies on the economy, the finances of the state, secularism (laïcité) and denominational schools. This discontent was beneficial to the Communists and the Gaullists.

In March 1951, Henri Queuille (Radical Party), became head of the cabinet. His Vice-Prime Ministers were Georges Bidault (MRP), Guy Mollet (SFIO) and René Pleven (UDSR). In order to limit the number of seats won by the Communists and the Gaullists, an electoral reform was passed. The proportional representation system was conserved but if an alliance of parties obtained more of 50% of votes in a given constituency, it won all the seats. The promoters of the electoral reform knew the Communists and the Gaullists were so different from allie contrary to the parties of the Third Force. They hoped the alliance of the pro-government parties would reach the 50% threshold in a maximum of constituencies, whereas the PCF and the RPF would be eliminated of representation.

Whilst the PCF and the RPF were the two largest parties in terms of the popular vote, the Third Force remained the parliamentary majority. Due to the ballot system, the Communist Party, which won more votes than any other party, was only third in terms of the number of seats won. In the winning coalition, the SFIO and the MRP lost support whereas the Radicals and the classical Right made gains. However, due to continuing internal divisions (about the denominational schools, the budget and the colonial question) the problem of the stability of the executive was not resolved.
In August 1951, René Pleven replaced Henri Queuille as Prime Minister and the Socialists left the cabinet.

Results

|-
! style="background-color:#E9E9E9;text-align:left;vertical-align:top;" colspan=2 |Parties and coalitions
! style="background-color:#E9E9E9;text-align:right;" | Abbr.
! style="background-color:#E9E9E9;text-align:right;" | Votes
! style="background-color:#E9E9E9;text-align:right;" | %
! style="background-color:#E9E9E9;text-align:right;" | Seats
|-
|style="background-color:#E75480"|
| style="text-align:left;" | French Section of the Workers' International (Section française de l'Internationale ouvrière)
| style="text-align:right;" | SFIO
| style="text-align:right;" |2,894,001
| style="text-align:right;" |15.39
| style="text-align:right;" |107
|-
|style="background-color:#1E90FF"|
| style="text-align:left;" | National Centre of Independents and Peasants (Centre national des indépendants et paysans)
| style="text-align:right;" |CNIP
| style="text-align:right;" |2,563,782
| style="text-align:right;" |13.64
| style="text-align:right;" |96
|-
|style="background-color:#00CCCC"|
| style="text-align:left;" | Popular Republican Movement (Mouvement républicain populaire)
| style="text-align:right;" |MRP
| style="text-align:right;" |2,369,778
| style="text-align:right;" |12.60
| style="text-align:right;" |95
|-
|style="background-color:#FBEC5D"|
| style="text-align:left;" | Rally of the Republican Lefts (Rassemblement des gauches républicaines)
| style="text-align:right;" |RGR
| style="text-align:right;" |1,913,003 	
| style="text-align:right;" |10.17
| style="text-align:right;" |93
|-
| colspan=3 style="text-align:left;" | Total "Third Force"
| style="text-align:right;" |9,740,564
| style="text-align:right;" |51.80
| style="text-align:right;" |388
|-
|style="background-color:#FF0000"|
| style="text-align:left;" | French Communist Party (Parti communiste français)
| style="text-align:right;" |PCF
| style="text-align:right;" |4,939,380
| style="text-align:right;" |26.27
| style="text-align:right;" |103
|-
|style="background-color:#0000C8"|
| style="text-align:left;" | Rally of the French People (Rassemblement du peuple français)
| style="text-align:right;" |RPF
| style="text-align:right;" |4,122,696
| style="text-align:right;" |21.93
| style="text-align:right;" |121
|-
|
| style="text-align:left;" |Total
|
| style="text-align:right;" |18,802,640
| style="text-align:right;" |100
| style="text-align:right;" |625
|-
| colspan=7 style="text-align:left;" |Abstention: 19.8%
|}

Parliamentary Groups

Sources 
Parties and Elections
Election-Politique

See also
1951 French legislative election in Guinea
1951 French legislative election in Algeria
1954 Guinea by-election

1951
1951 elections in France